Ted Polglaze (born 3 May 1968) is an Australian bobsledder. He competed in the four man event at the 1998 Winter Olympics.

References

External links
 

1968 births
Living people
Australian male bobsledders
Olympic bobsledders of Australia
Bobsledders at the 1998 Winter Olympics
Sportspeople from Perth, Western Australia